Clytus chemsaki is a species of beetle in the family Cerambycidae. It was described by Hovore and Giesbert in 1974.

References

Clytini
Beetles described in 1974